Senator Knight may refer to:

Horatio G. Knight (1818–1895), Massachusetts State Senate
John Knight (judge) (1871–1955), New York State Senate
Nehemiah R. Knight (1780–1854), U.S. Senator from Rhode Island from 1821 to 1841
Steve Knight (politician) (born 1966), California State Senate
William J. Knight (1929–2004), California State Senate